Jordan Spence may refer to:

Jordan Spence (born 1990), English footballer
Jordan Spence (ice hockey) (born 2001), Australian ice hockey player